Úrvalsdeild kvenna is a name given to top-tier women's competitions in Iceland and may refer to:
 Úrvalsdeild kvenna (basketball), the top tier women's basketball league in Iceland
 Úrvalsdeild kvenna (football), the top tier women's football league in Iceland
 Úrvalsdeild kvenna (handball), the top tier women's handball league in Iceland
 Úrvalsdeild kvenna (ice hockey), the top tier women's ice hockey league in Iceland

See also
Úrvalsdeild karla (disambiguation)